This article provides information on candidates who stood for the 1934 Australian federal election. The election was held on 15 September 1934.

By-elections, appointments and defections

By-elections and appointments
On 6 February 1932, Eddie Ward (NSW Labor) was elected to replace John Clasby (UAP) as the member for East Sydney.
On 6 April 1933, Herbert Collett (UAP) was appointed as a Western Australian Senator to replace Sir Hal Colebatch (UAP).
On 11 November 1933, James Fairbairn (UAP) was elected to replace Stanley Bruce (UAP) as the member for Flinders.
On 5 June 1934, William Holman (UAP), the member for Martin, died. No by-election was held due to the proximity of the election.
On 31 July 1934, Charles McGrath (UAP), the member for Ballaarat, died. No by-election was held due to the proximity of the election.
On 2 August 1934, Walter McNicoll (Country), the member for Werriwa, resigned. No by-election was held due to the proximity of the election.

Defections
In 1933, Independent MP Sir Littleton Groom (Darling Downs) joined the United Australia Party.
In 1934, Country Senator Robert Elliott (Victoria) lost preselection. He resigned from the party and sat as an Independent.
In 1934, Labor Senator John Daly (South Australia) was expelled from the state branch of the party, and sat as an Independent.
In 1934, a dispute between the federal Australian Country Party and the state-based United Country Party in Victoria saw the two parties endorse candidates separately. The UCP had demanded that sitting members sign a new pledge before being re-endorsed, which several MPs objected to. The two sitting members, deputy party leader Thomas Paterson (Gippsland) and Hugh McClelland (Wimmera), were endorsed by the federal party. The other Victorian Country Party MP, William Hill (Echuca), retired rather than sign the pledge.

Redistributions and seat changes
Redistributions of electoral boundaries occurred in New South Wales, Queensland and South Australia.
In New South Wales, the UAP-held seat of South Sydney was renamed Watson. The Labor-held seat of Cook and the UAP-held seats of East Sydney (gained by NSW Labor in a by-election) and Lang also became notionally NSW Labor.
The member for Lang, Dick Dein (UAP), contested the Senate.
The member for South Sydney, John Jennings (UAP), contested Watson.
In Queensland, the Labor-held seat of Oxley was renamed Griffith.
The member for Oxley, Frank Baker (Labor), contested Griffith.
In South Australia, the UAP-held seat of Angas was abolished.
The member for Corangamite, William Gibson (Country), contested the Senate.

Retiring Members and Senators

Labor
 Frank Anstey MP (Bourke, Vic)

United Australia
 Malcolm Cameron MP (Barker, SA)
 Moses Gabb MP (Angas, SA)
 John Latham MP (Kooyong, Vic)
 George Mackay MP (Lilley, Qld)
 William Watson MP (Fremantle, WA)
Senator Sir Walter Kingsmill (WA)
Senator Sir Harry Lawson (Vic)
Senator Matthew Reid (Qld)

Country
 William Hill MP (Echuca, Vic)

Independent
Senator John Daly (SA) [elected as Labor]

House of Representatives
Sitting members at the time of the election are shown in bold text. Successful candidates are highlighted in the relevant colour. Where there is possible confusion, an asterisk (*) is also used.

New South Wales

Northern Territory

Queensland

South Australia

Tasmania

Victoria

Western Australia

Senate
Sitting Senators are shown in bold text. Tickets that elected at least one Senator are highlighted in the relevant colour. Successful candidates are identified by an asterisk (*).

New South Wales
Three seats were up for election. The Labor Party was defending three seats (although Senators Dunn and Rae had joined the Lang Labor breakaway). United Australia Party Senators Charles Cox and Sir Walter Massy-Greene and Country Party Senator Charles Hardy were not up for re-election.

Queensland
Three seats were up for election. The United Australia Party was defending three seats. Labor Senators Gordon Brown, Joe Collings and John MacDonald were not up for re-election.

South Australia
Three seats were up for election. The Labor Party was defending three seats. United Australia Party Senators Jack Duncan-Hughes and Alexander McLachlan and Country Party Senator Oliver Badman were not up for re-election.

Tasmania
Three seats were up for election. The United Australia Party was defending three seats. Note that, apart from Group A, all candidates appeared in the ungrouped column. United Australia Party Senators John Millen, Herbert Payne and Burford Sampson were not up for re-election.

Victoria
Three seats were up for election. The United Australia Party-Country Party Coalition was defending two seats. The Labor Party was defending one seat. United Australia Party Senators Tom Brennan, James Guthrie and William Plain were not up for re-election.

Western Australia
Three seats were up for election. The United Australia Party-Country Party Coalition was defending three seats. United Australia Party Senators Patrick Lynch and Sir George Pearce and Country Party Senator William Carroll were not up for re-election.

See also
 1934 Australian federal election
 Members of the Australian House of Representatives, 1931–1934
 Members of the Australian House of Representatives, 1934–1937
 Members of the Australian Senate, 1932–1935
 Members of the Australian Senate, 1935–1938
 List of political parties in Australia

References
Adam Carr's Election Archive - House of Representatives 1934
Adam Carr's Election Archive - Senate 1934

1934 in Australia
Candidates for Australian federal elections